Lee Sang-hee is a Korean name consisting of the family name Lee and the given name Sang-hee. It may refer to:

 Lee Sang-hee (born 1945), a South Korean general
 Lee Sang-hee (footballer) (born 1988)
 Lee Sang-hee (actress) (born 1983)